Triangle K is a kosher certification agency under the leadership of Rabbi Aryeh R. Ralbag. It was founded by his late father, Rabbi Yehosef Ralbag. The hechsher is a letter K enclosed in an equilateral triangle.

Supervision and certification
They supervise a number of major brands, including Del Monte, Hebrew National, Ocean Spray, Sunsweet, Sunny Delight, SunChips and Wonder Bread.

Minute Maid products used to be supervised by Triangle K. Since 2013, the Orthodox Union has been providing kosher certification for Minute Maid products instead. 

Many Orthodox Jews eat only glatt kosher. Triangle K continues to certify foods as kosher that are not glatt kosher. As a result, some Orthodox Jews will not eat food that is certified by Triangle K.

K Meshulash
The name K Meshulash is sometimes used in addition to the trademarked Triangle K name. Meshulash means triangle, triple, or tripled in Hebrew.

See also
Kosher foods
Kashrut

References

External links
 

Kosher food certification organizations
Consumer symbols